Selam Podrinju is a 2002 album by the Bosnian root music group Sateliti.

Track listing
Selam Podrinju (Salaam to Podrinje)
Lovac Na Ribe (Hunter for Chicks)
Vidimo Se U Zivinicama (See You In Zivinice)
Ja Sam Pravi Lola (I'm a Real Dude)
Kamenicke Lole (Dudes of Kamenica)
Ja Sam Svadbu Najavio (I Announced A Wedding Celebration)
Hej Sokole (O Hawk)
Tragedija Dvoje Mladih (Tragedy of Two Young People)
Miki Violina (Mickey the Violin)
Merak Mi Je Curu Poljubit (It Feels Good To Kiss A Girl)
Mnogo Muza Vara (She Often Cheats on her Husband)
Ja Dolare Necu Suzama Da Placam (I Won't Pay Tears for Dollars)

2002 albums
Sateliti albums